Nazi morality is the moral system invented by and used by Nazism in Nazi Germany. Earlier scholarship denied the existence of Nazi morality, defining Nazism as existing outside of morality. More recently, scholars have attempted to understand the moral thinking of Nazism.

References

Morality
Nazism